Naheed Farid is an Afghan politician. She was the youngest member of the Afghan parliament. Fearing for her life, she fled Afghanistan after the Afghan government fell and the Taliban seized control.

References

Living people
1984 births
Afghan feminists
21st-century Afghan women politicians
21st-century Afghan politicians
Members of the House of the People (Afghanistan)